Bantam Spectra is the science fiction division of American publishing company  Bantam Books, which is owned by Random House.

According to their website, Spectra publishes "science fiction, fantasy, horror, and speculative novels from recognizable authors". Spectra authors have collectively won 31 such awards in the fields of science fiction and fantasy, and been nominated on 132 occasions. These authors include the following:

 Anthony Ballantyne
 Bruce Sterling
 Catherine Asaro
 Catherynne Valente
 Charles Platt
 Christopher Barzak
 Connie Willis
 Dan Simmons
 David Brin
 David J Williams
 Doug Beason
 Elisabeth Vonarburg
 Elizabeth Bear
 Elizabeth Hand
 Ellen Kushner
 George R. R. Martin
 Gregory Benford
 Ian McDonald
 Jamil Nasir
 Joe Lansdale
 John Ford
 Justina Robson
 Karen Fowler
 Kelley Armstrong
 Kevin J. Anderson
 Kim Robinson
 Lisa Goldstein
 Liz Williams
 M. K. Hobson
 Maggie Furey
 Margaret Ogden
 Mark Budz
 Michael McQuay
 Neal Stephenson
 Patrice Murphy
 Patricia Geary
 Paula Volsky
 Richard Grant
 Robert Charles Wilson
 Roberta MacAvoy
 Roger MacBride Allen
 Scott Lynch
 Sheri Tepper
 T. A. Pratt
 Tim Lebbon
 William Gibson
 William McCarthy

Bantam Spectra series

Star Wars
More than 20 Star Wars novels have been published under the Bantam Spectra Imprint. Notable Spectra Star Wars novels include Timothy Zahn's blockbuster Thrawn Trilogy, Barbara Hambly's Children of the Jedi, and others. Eventually Lucasfilm, which owns Star Wars, decided to have Scholastic and Del Rey publish their books, leading to the end of the Bantam Spectra Star Wars era.

References

External links
 
 

American speculative fiction publishers
Random House
Science fiction publishers